Eucalyptus glaucina, commonly known as the slaty red gum, is a species of small to medium-sized tree endemic to New South Wales. It has smooth, white and grey bark, lance-shaped adult leaves, flower buds in groups of seven, white flowers and hemispherical fruit with the valves protruding well above the level of the rim.

Description
It has smooth, mottled white and grey bark that is shed in large plates or flakes. Flowering has been recorded in November and the flowers are white.

Taxonomy and naming
Slaty red gum was first formally described in 1934 by William Blakely who gave it the name Eucalyptus umbellata var. glaucina. The name was published in Blakely's book, A Key to the Eucalypts from specimens collected by John L. Boorman. In 1962, Lawrie Johnson raised the variety to species status as E. glaucina.

Distribution and habitat
Eucalyptus glaucina grows in grassy woodland and forest. It was known in the past from the Casino, Taree, Stroud, Dungog and Paterson districts but is at present only conserved in a single flora reserve near Casino.

Conservation status
Slaty red gum is listed as "vulnerable" under the Australian Government Environment Protection and Biodiversity Conservation Act 1999 and the New South Wales Government Biodiversity Conservation Act 2016. The main threats to the species are loss of habitat due to land clearing, lack of regeneration due to grazing pressure and hybridisation with other red gum species.

References

glaucina
Myrtales of Australia
Flora of New South Wales
Trees of Australia
Plants described in 1934
Taxa named by William Blakely